Nordfeld is a manor house on the island of Møn in southeastern Denmark. The estate was created in 1774 but the current, Neo-Gothica main building is from 1876.

History

Jørgen Wichfeld Christopher Schøller Bülow
 
The entire island of Møn was up until the second half of the 18th century crown land. Nordfeld is one of many manor houses in eastern Denmark that was created when Frederick V and later Christian VII began to sell off crown land as part of the agricultural reforms of the time. The intention was to sell the land to the local tenant farmers but Count  Conrad Holck and Tyge Thygesen, who were put in charge of the sale, were opposed to the reforms. They divided Møn into five large estates which were sold in auction in 1770. The local farmers showed up in large numbers at the auction to buy the entire island but only managed to buy three of the estates due to a requirement that guarantees for the payment should be provided the following morning at 10 am at the latest. Nordfeld was therefore not sold until a new auction was held in March 1774. After Johan Friedrich Struense's progressive government had been replaced by a more conservative one, it was no longer possible for farmers to buy manors and Nordfeld was instead acquired by Jørgen Wichfeld. He immediately constructed a new manor house on the land.

Peder Sølling and Christopher Schøller Bülow

In 1787, Wichfeld sold Nordfeld to Peder Sølling. He sold many of the farms to the tenant farmers before selling Nordfeld to Christopher Schøller Bülow in 1806. He was already the owner of several other manors and had embarked on a promising career as civil servant but experienced economic difficulties during the agricultural crisis of the 1810s and went bankrupt in 1820. He fled the country after being indicted for embezzlement with public funds and was sentenced to prison in 1821.

The Danneskiold-Samsøe family

Nordfeld was sold to Christian Conrad, Count of Danneskiold-Samsøe. In 1823, he passed it on to his youngest son, Otto Danneskiold-Samsøe, who was director of the Royal Danish Mail Services. He constructed a new main building.

After Otto Danneskiold-Samsøe's death in 1894, Nordfeld was passed on to his son Christian Conrad Sophus Danneskiold-Samsøe who became known as the "theatre count" after being appointed to director of the Royal Danish Theatre later that same year.  After his death in 1908, Nordfeld was passed on first to his widow Wanda Danneskiold-Samsøe and then his son Viggo Danneskiold-Samsøe who became the last member of the family to own the estate.

Architecture
The current main building was built by Frederik Wilsbech for Otto Danneskjold-Samsøe in 1774–76. It is a one-story red brick building in Gothic Revival style with Crow-stepped gables. On each side of the building is a three-bay central projection tipped by a Crow-stepped gable. The central projection on the front side contains the main entrance while the one on the rear side features as large ceranda overlooking the garden. The central projection is flanked by two crow-stepped gable dormers on both sides of the building.

Ro, the south of the main building, is a complex of buildings: Avlsgården (farm building) consists of four one-story buildings in red brick with details in yellow brick and red-painted timber, arched windows and tin roofs, Forvalterboligen (manager's house) is a one-story red brick building on a stone foundation. It has a red tile roof with three chimneys,  Herskabsstalden  (stables) is also a one-story brick building. It has a slate roof. A tall gabled dormer opens to the jayloft. A brick cornice runs below the roof. A total of 11 individual buildings have been listed. They include the main building, the four-winged complex of farm buildings, the farm manager's house with the stables and outbuilding and the gardener's house with another outbuilding.

Today
Nordfeld is today owned by Jens Krarup Haubroe. The estate covers a total area of 1,151 hectares. It comprises the farm Klosterskovgård as well as the woodlands Elmelunde Kohave and Ridefogedlukke.

List of owners
 (1774-1787) Jørgen Wichfeld
 (1787-1806) Peder Sølling
 (1806-1820) Christopher Schøller Bülow
 (1820-1823) Christian Conrad, Count of Danneskiold-Samsøe
 (1823-1894) Otto Sophus Danneskiold-Samsøe
 (1894-1908) Christian Conrad Sophus Danneskiold-Samsøe
 (1908-1916) Wanda Sophie Elisabeth Candia Zahrtmann, gift Danneskiold-Samsøe
 (1916-1930) Viggo Danneskiold-Samsøe
 (1930-      ) J.S. Krarup
 (2002–present) Jens Krarup Haubroe

References

External links
 Nordfeld on vintage postcards

Møn
Manor houses in Vordingborg Municipality
Listed buildings and structures in Vordingborg Municipality
Listed castles and manor houses in Denmark
Houses completed in 1874
Buildings and structures associated with the Wichfeld family
Buildings and structures associated with the Danneskiold-Samsøe family